The 2007–08 State League Twenty20 was the inaugural season of the women's Twenty20 cricket competition played in New Zealand. It ran from December 2007 to February 2008, with 6 provincial teams taking part. Canterbury Magicians won the tournament, topping the group with four wins and one abandoned match.

The tournament ran alongside the 2007–08 State League.

Competition format 
Teams played in a round-robin in a group of six, playing 5 matches overall. Matches were played using a Twenty20 format. The winners of the group were crowned the Champions.

The group worked on a points system with positions being based on the total points. Points were awarded as follows:

Win: 4 points 
Tie: 2 points 
Loss: 0 points.
Abandoned/No Result: 2 points.

Points table

Source: ESPN Cricinfo

Statistics

Most runs

Source: ESPN Cricinfo

Most wickets

Source: ESPN Cricinfo

References

External links
 Series home at ESPN Cricinfo

Super Smash (cricket)
2007–08 New Zealand cricket season
State League Twenty20